The women's 800 metre freestyle event at the 2016 Summer Olympics took place between 11–12 August at the Olympic Aquatics Stadium.

Summary
U.S. swimmer Katie Ledecky set a new world record to defend her Olympic title in this event and to successfully complete a distance freestyle treble at a single edition for the first time, since Debbie Meyer did so in 1968. Dominating the race from the start, Ledecky quickly dropped two seconds under a world-record pace, as she pulled further away from the field to overturn her own existing standard with a gold-medal time in 8:04.79. Separated from the leader by 11.38 seconds, Great Britain's Jazmin Carlin edged out the Hungarian challenger Boglárka Kapás at the final lap for her second silver of the meet in 8:16.17. Meanwhile, Kapás faded down the stretch to earn a bronze in 8:16.37, two tenths of a second short of Carlin's time.

London 2012 runner-up Mireia Belmonte slipped off the podium to fourth in a Spanish record of 8:18.55. Outside the 8:20 club, Australia's Jessica Ashwood (8:20.32) and Ledecky's teammate Leah Smith (8:20.95), bronze medalist in the 400 m freestyle, picked up the fifth and sixth spots respectively, finishing 63-hundredths of a second apart from each other. Denmark's Lotte Friis (8:24.50) and Germany's Sarah Köhler (8:27.75) rounded out the championship field.

Ledecky also overturned the existing Olympic record in 8:12.86 to top the field of twenty-seven swimmers in the prelims, taking 1.24 seconds off the standard set by Great Britain's Rebecca Adlington in a since-banned high-tech bodysuit in Beijing eight years earlier.

Records
Prior to this competition, the existing world and Olympic records were as follows.

The following records were broken during the competition:

Competition format

The competition consisted of two rounds: heats and a final. The swimmers with the best 8 times in the heats advanced to the final. Swim-offs were used as necessary to break ties for advancement to the next round.

Results

Heats

Final

References

Women's 00800 metre freestyle
Olympics
2016 in women's swimming
Women's events at the 2016 Summer Olympics